The Sheila A. Egoff Children's Literature Prize is awarded annually as the BC Book Prize for the best juvenile or young adult novel or work of non-fiction by a resident of British Columbia or the Yukon, Canada. It was first awarded in 1987. It is supported by the B.C Library Association.

History
Originally, the prize was awarded for illustrated and non-illustrated literature, but since 2003 the Christie Harris Illustrated Children's Literature Prize has been awarded for illustrated books and the Sheila A. Egoff Children’s Literature Prize for non-illustrated books.

Winners and finalists

1987 Sarah Ellis - The Baby Project
Paul Yee - The Curses of Third Uncle
James Houston - The Falcon Bow
1988 Nicola Morgan - Pride of Lions
Kit Pearson - A Handful of Time
Mary Razzell - Salmonberry Wine
1989 Mary-Ellen Lang Collura - Sunny
Florence McNeil - Catriona's Island
Deborah Turney Zagwyn - Mood Pocket, Mud Bucket
1990 Paul Yee - Tales from Gold Mountain
Sarah Ellis - Next-Door Neighbours
Kit Pearson - The Sky is Falling
1991 Nancy Hundal - I Heard My Mother Call My Name
Sue Ann Alderson - Chapter One
Scott Watson - Jack Shadbolt
1992 Alexandra Morton - Siwiti: A Whale's Story
Kit Pearson - Looking at the Moon
Sarah Ellis - Pick Up Sticks
1993 Shirley Sterling - My Name is Seepeetza
Ainslie Manson - A Dog Came Too
Sue Ann Alderson - Sure as Strawberries
1994 Julie Lawson - White Jade Tiger
David Bouchard - If You're Not from the Prairie
Sue Ann Alderson - A Ride for Martha
1995 Lillian Boraks-Nemetz - The Old Brown Suitcase
James Heneghan - Torn Away
Mary Razzell - White Wave
1996 Nan Gregory - How Smudge Came
Constance Horne - Emily Carr's Woo
Andrea Spalding - Finders Keepers
1997 Sarah Ellis - Back of Beyond
Kit Pearson - Awake and Dreaming
W.D. Valgardson - Sarah and the People of Sand River
1998 James Heneghan - Wish Me Luck
John Wilson - Across Frozen Seas
Julie Lawson - Emma and the Silk Train
1999 Sandra Lightburn - Driftwood Cove
Paul Yee - The Boy in the Attic
Ann Walsh - The Doctor's Apprentice
2000 Vivien Bowers - WOW Canada! Exploring the Land from Coast to Coast to Coast
Julie Ovenell-Carter (ill. Kitty Macaulay) - The Butterflies' Promise
W.D. Valgardson - The Divorced Kids Club and Other Stories
Karen Rivers - Dream Water
Nikki Tate - Tarragon Island
2001 James Heneghan - The Grave
Ainslie Manson - Ballerinas Don't Wear Glasses
W.D. Valgardson - Frances
Gayle Friesen - Men of Stone
Nikki Tate - No Cafes in Narnia
2002 Polly Horvath - Everything on a Waffle
Norma Charles - The Accomplice
Maggie de Vries - Chance and the Butterfly
Sarah Ellis - Dear Canada: A Prairie as Wide as the Sea
Valerie Wyatt and John Mantha - The Kids Book of Canadian Firsts
2003 James Heneghan - Flood
Karen Rivers - The Gold Diggers Club
Luanne Armstrong - Jeannie and the Gentle Giants
John Lekich - The Losers' Club
Gayle Friesen - Losing Forever
2004 Dennis Foon - Skud
Polly Horvath - The Canning Season
John Wilson - Dancing Elephants and Floating Continents
Sarah Ellis - The Several Lives of Orphan Jack
Irene N. Watts and Lillian Boraks-Nemetz - Tapestry of Hope: Holocaust Writing for Young People
2005 Susan Juby - Miss Smithers
Eileen Kernaghan - The Alchemist's Daughter
Cynthia Nugent - Francesca and the Magic Bike
Sandy Frances Duncan - Gold Rush Orphan
Shelley Hrdlitschka - Kat's Fall
Sylvia Olsen - White Girl
2006 Barbara Nickel - Hannah Waters and the Daughter of Johann Sebastien Bach
Iain Lawrence - The Convicts
Pamela Porter - The Crazy Man
John Wilson - Four Steps to Death
Polly Horvath - The Vacation
2007 Sarah Ellis - Odd Man Out
Iain Lawrence - Gemini Summer
Craig Spence - Josh & the Magic Vial
James Heneghan - Safe House
Glen Huser - Skinnybones and the Wrinkle Queen
2008 Polly Horvath - The Corps of the Bare-Boned Plane
John Wilson - The Alchemist's Dream
David Jones - Baboon: A Novel
Gayle Friesen - For Now
Meg Tilly - Porcupine
2009 Polly Horvath - My One Hundred Adventures
Graham McNamee - Bonechiller
Sarah N. Harvey - The Lit Report
Iain Lawrence - The Seance
Robin Stevenson - A Thousand Shades of Blue
2010 Carrie Mac - The Gryphon Project
Sylvia Olsen - Counting on Hope
Robin Stevenson - Inferno
Kristin Butcher - Return to Bone Tree Hill
Rachelle Delaney - The Ship of Lost Souls
2011 Maggie de Vries - Hunger Journeys
Susin Nielsen - Dear George Clooney, Please Marry My Mom
Christy Jordon-Fenton, Margaret Pokiak-Fenton - Fatty Legs: A True Story
Gina McMurchy-Barber - Free as a Bird
Polly Horvath - Northward to the Moon
2012 Moira Young - Blood Red Road
Pamela Porter - I'll Be Watching
Caitlyn Vernon - Nowhere Else on Earth: Standing Tall for the Great Bear Rainforest
Glen Huser - The Runaway
Karen Rivers - What is Real
2013 Caroline Adderson - Middle of Nowhere 
Rachel Hartman - Seraphina
John Lekich - The Prisoner of Snowflake Falls
Victoria Miles - Mimi Power and the I-Don't-Know-What
Susin Nielsen - The Reluctant Journal of Henry K. Larsen
2014 Ashley Little - The New Normal 
Becky Citra - If Only
Ari Goelman - The Path of Names
Silvana Goldemberg, translated by Emilie Smith - Victoria
Robin Stevenson - Record Breaker
2015 Maggie de Vries - Rabbit Ears 
Elizabeth Stewart - Blue Gold
Gabrielle Prendergast - Capricious
Becky Citra - Finding Grace
Eileen Kernaghan - Sophie, in Shadow
2016 Susan Juby - The Truth Commission 
Linda Bailey - Seven Dead Pirates
Darren Groth - Are You Seeing Me?
Susin Nielsen - We Are All Made of Molecules
Jordan Stratford - The Case of the Missing Moonstone (The Wollstonecraft Detective Agency, Book 1)
2017 Iain Lawrence - The Skeleton Tree 
Kathleen Cherry - Everyday Hero
R.K. McLay - The Rahtrum Chronicles: The Dream
Kit Pearson - A Day of Signs and Wonders
Robin Stevenson - Pride: Celebrating Diversity & Community
2018 G. S. Prendergast - Zero Repeat Forever 
Julie Burtinshaw - Saying Good-bye to London
Norma Charles - Runner: Harry Jerome, World’s Fastest Man
Anne Fleming - The Goat
Kallie George - Heartwood Hotel Book 1: A True Home
2019 Susin Nielsen - No Fixed Address 
Janice Lynn Mather - Learning to Breathe
Polly Horvath - Very Rich
Monique Gray Smith and Richard Van Camp - The Journey Forward
Lianne Oelke - Nice Try, Jane Sinner
2020 Robin Stevenson - My Body, My Choice
Sara Cassidy -Nevers
Sabina Khan - The Love and Lies Of Rukhsana Ali
Julia Nobel - The Mystery of Black Hollow Lane
Eldon Yellowhorn and Kathy Lowinger - What the Eagle Sees
2021 Sara Cassidy - Genius Jolene
Dan Bar-el - Just Beyond the Very, Very Far North
Melanie Stewart - Heads Up
Gail Anderson-Dargatz - The Ride Home
Tanya Lloyd Kyi - Me and Banksy
2022 Robbie Waisman and Susan McClelland, Boy from Buchenwald: The True Story of a Holocaust Survivor
Angela Ahn and Julie Kwon, Peter Lee’s Notes from the Field
Tanya Christenson, A Soft Place to Fall
Barbara Nickel, Dear Peter, Dear Ulla
Xiran Jay Zhao, Iron Widow

References

Sources
Sheila A. Egoff Children’s Literature Prize, official website
BC Book Prizes

BC and Yukon Book Prizes
1987 establishments in British Columbia
Awards established in 1987
Canadian children's literary awards